Beirut International Center Production (abbreviated BIC Production) is a Lebanese film production company which produceds Lebanese and dubbed foreign works.

Filmography

Film

Television series

Dubbing
Muhammad: The Messenger of God
Mokhtarnameh
Prophet Joseph

References

http://www.elfann.com/news/show/1122550/خاص-الفن-درب-الياسمين-ينقل-مسلسلات-المقاومة-العسكر
https://web.archive.org/web/20161220170111/http://alsudanalyoum.com/2016/05/12/%d8%a7%d9%84%d8%a7%d8%b3%d8%aa%d8%b9%d8%af%d8%a7%d8%af-%d9%84%d8%af%d8%a8%d9%84%d8%ac%d8%a9-%d9%81%d9%8a%d9%84%d9%85-%d9%85%d8%ad%d9%85%d8%af-%d8%b1%d8%b3%d9%88%d9%84-%d8%a7%d9%84%d9%84%d9%87-%d8%a7/
http://www.imdb.com/company/co0594232/
http://almasalah.com/ar/news/74875/دبلجة-فيلم-محمد-رسول-الله--إلى-العربية
http://www.tayyar.org/News/Entertainment/8323
https://web.archive.org/web/20160822074908/http://www.alebaatv.com/%D8%A7%D9%84%D8%A7%D8%AA%D9%81%D8%A7%D9%82-%D8%B9%D9%84%D9%89-%D8%AF%D8%A8%D9%84%D8%AC%D8%A9-%D9%81%D9%8A%D9%84%D9%85-%D9%85%D8%AD%D9%85%D8%AF-%D8%B1%D8%B3%D9%88%D9%84-%D8%A7%D9%84%D9%84%D9%87/
http://bic-prod.com

External links

Lebanese dubbing studios
Mass media companies established in 2007
Television production companies of Lebanon